Andrea Mead Lawrence (April 19, 1932 – March 30, 2009) was an American alpine ski racer and environmentalist. She competed in three Winter Olympics and one additional World Championship (Olympic competitions also counted as the Worlds during that period), and was the first American alpine skier to win two Olympic gold medals.

Skiing career
Mead was born in Rutland County, Vermont, to an alpine skiing family that owned and operated the Pico Peak ski area. At age 14 she made the national team, and at age 15 competed in the 1948 Winter Olympics in St. Moritz, Switzerland, where she placed eighth in the slalom. Two years later, Mead placed sixth in the giant slalom and ninth in the downhill at the 1950 World Championships in Aspen, United States.

At the 1952 Winter Olympics in Oslo, Norway, Mead Lawrence was selected as captain of the U.S. women's team at age 19. This led to her being the January 21 Time cover-story, just days before the team arrived in Oslo. The Time story was prescientshe won both the slalom and the giant slalom events.

Between the 1952 and 1956 Winter Olympics, Mead Lawrence gave birth to three children, sitting out the 1954 World Championship season.

Returning for the 1956 Winter Olympics, in Cortina d'Ampezzo, Italy, Mead Lawrence competed in all three disciplines, placing fourth in the giant slalom.

In 1958, just two years after retiring from competition, Mead Lawrence was inducted into the U.S. National Ski Hall of Fame. She was chosen as the penultimate torchbearer at the 1960 Winter Olympics in Squaw Valley, US, passed it to American 1952 Olympic gold medal speed skater Ken Henry, who circled the ice rink then ascended the Tribune of Honor and ignited the Olympic flame.

Olympic results

World Championship results 

From 1948 through 1980, the Winter Olympics were also the World Championships for alpine skiing.

Life after ski racing
After fighting against development at Mammoth Mountain ski area, she was elected as a Mono County supervisor in 1982, and served for 16 years.

In 1980, her memoir was published as A Practice of Mountains, with Sara Burnaby as a co-author.

In 2003, she founded the Andrea Lawrence Institute for Mountains and Rivers', a non-profit organization committed to conservation, specifically in the eastern Sierra Nevada mountains. A resident of the area for over 40 years, she was also a long-time advocate for the preservation of Mono Lake and other environmental concerns.

On April 29, 2010 U.S. Senator Barbara Boxer and U.S. Representative Howard P. "Buck" McKeon announced legislation to rename Peak 12,240 in Mono County as "Mount Andrea Lawrence," in memory of Lawrence. On January 10, 2013, President Obama signed into law the Mt. Andrea Lawrence Designation Act of 2011, officially designating Mount Andrea Lawrence.

Lawrence is a member of the Vermont Sports Hall of Fame, inducted in its inaugural class of 2012.

On November 8, 2013, two Vermont non-profit organizations opened a new multi-use adaptive sports and youth skiing center at Andrea Mead Lawrence's home mountain of Pico Peak, Vermont. The Andrea Mead Lawrence Lodge at Pico will serve as the permanent home and base camp for the non-profit missions of Vermont Adaptive Ski and Sports and the Pico Ski Education Foundation.

Personal life

Family
Mead married fellow U.S. Ski Team member David Lawrence in Switzerland in March 1951. They moved to a ranch in Parshall, Colorado in 1954 and then to Aspen in the 1960s, where she became a member of the town's planning board. The couple separated and divorced in 1967. With five young children and little money, she moved her family in 1968 to Mammoth Lakes, California, near Mammoth Mountain.

Her nephew is Matt Mead, Governor of Wyoming from 2011 to 2019.

Death
Lawrence was diagnosed with leiomyosarcoma in 2000, from which she died on March 30, 2009, several weeks before her 77th birthday.

In popular culture
She was portrayed by Kandi McCoy (Daughter of Dave McCoy) in the 1975 film The Other Side of the Mountain (credited as "Candy McCoy").

References

External links
 

Skiing History.org – Andrea Mead Lawrence
Vermont Ski Museum.org – Andrea Mead Lawrence
alimar.org – Andrea Lawrence Institute for Mountains and Rivers
Nevasport.com – Andrea Mead Biography and photos
Bio of Andrea Mead Lawrence at Andrea Lawrence Institute for Mountains and Rivers
 Vermont Sports Hall of Fame Bio

Alpine skiers at the 1948 Winter Olympics
Alpine skiers at the 1952 Winter Olympics
Alpine skiers at the 1956 Winter Olympics
American athlete-politicians
American female alpine skiers
County supervisors in California
Deaths from cancer in California
Deaths from brain cancer in the United States
Olympic gold medalists for the United States in alpine skiing
Sportspeople from Aspen, Colorado
People from Mammoth Lakes, California
People from Rutland County, Vermont
Sportspeople from Vermont
Sportspeople from California
Medalists at the 1952 Winter Olympics
20th-century American politicians
1932 births
2009 deaths
Deaths from leiomyosarcoma
20th-century American women
21st-century American women